Amezinium metilsulfate (INN, trade name Regulton) is a sympathomimetic drug used for the treatment of low blood pressure. It has multiple mechanisms, including stimulation of alpha and beta-1 receptors and inhibition of noradrenaline and tyramine uptake.

References 

Pyridazines